National Bulk Carriers was a shipping company which owned and operated oil tanker ships and bulk carriers. Some of them were among the largest in the world at that time. It was one of the largest multinational corporations in the world.

It was founded by Daniel K. Ludwig. At one time, the company had more than 20,000 employees and several billion dollars in assets.

World War II
During World War II Ludwig owned and operated the Welding Shipyards, Norfolk, Virginia which built T3 tanker ships for National Bulk Carriers.

National Bulk Carriers fleet of T2 tankers were used to help the World War II effort. During World War II National Bulk Carriers operated Merchant navy ships for the United States Shipping Board. During World War II National Bulk Carriers was active with charter shipping with the Maritime Commission and War Shipping Administration. National Bulk Carriers operated tankers for the merchant navy. The ship was run by its National Bulk Carriers crew and the US Navy supplied United States Navy Armed Guards to man the deck guns and radio.

Ships
Some National Bulk Carriers tankers:

SS Pan-Pennsylvania
SS Pendelton
SS Hat Creek
HMS Attacker (D02), never entered service
SS Nitro
Roma
Battle Mountain
Callabee
Evans Creek
Fisher's Hill
Five Forks
Fort Charlotte
Gold Creek
Joshua Tree
Kaposia
Silverpeak
Trimble's Ford
Wagon Box
Whittier Hills
Virginia sunk by U-507

See also
World War II United States Merchant Navy
List of Type T2 tankers
American Petroleum Transport Corporation

References

External links
Flat Fee Movers Website
Ships built by National Bulk Carriers

Shipping companies of the United States